Véronique Laury (born 29 June 1965) is a French businesswoman, was chief executive officer (CEO) of Kingfisher, a UK based retail group, from February 2015 to September 2019.

In March 2019, it was announced that Laury would leave Kingfisher at a date to be announced following the failure of her "One Kingfisher" recovery plan and a 52.8% drop in pre-tax profits.

Early life
Véronique Laury was born on 29 June 1965. She attended the Sciences Po, the Paris Institute of Political Studies, or Institut d'études politiques de Paris (IEP).

Career
She spent fifteen years at Leroy Merlin in France.

Kingfisher
In September 2014, it was announced that Laury would replace Ian Cheshire as CEO of Kingfisher plc, a FTSE 100 British multinational retail company from February 2015. Laury has worked at Castorama, a subsidiary of Kingfisher, for eleven years, including roles at B&Q.

Personal life
She is also known as Veronique Laury-Deroubaix. She has a daughter and two sons, and lives in Lille. She enjoys horse riding, and is a former show jumper.

References

External links
 Kingfisher

1965 births
French chief executives
French show jumping riders
20th-century French businesswomen
20th-century French businesspeople
Kingfisher plc
People from Lille
Place of birth missing (living people)
Sciences Po alumni
Living people
French female equestrians
Sportspeople from Nord (French department)
21st-century British businesswomen